Catch the Brass Ring is the debut album from Los Angeles, California based singer-songwriter Ferraby Lionheart. It was released on September 4, 2007, by Nettwerk Records. The album was recorded at Red Rockets Glare and Hotpie Studios in Los Angeles.

On the recording of the album, Ferraby says this on his website: "The record took a while, due to a lot of starting and stopping, working around downtime, and writing the album as I went. I wanted to capture the intimacy and simplicity of the self-titled EP, but at the same time make a more adventurous record. Plus some of the songs were really calling for an elaborate treatment. This was sometimes difficult to balance, but I think it helped create a nice diversity about the album. Many wonderful folks I've met in LA came out to play horns and strings and drums throughout the process."

A music video was produced for the song "Small Planet." link

Track listing 
All tracks by Ferraby Lionheart

 "Un Ballo Della Luna" - 1:47
 "Small Planet" - 3:14
 "Vermont Avenue" - 2:26
 "Call Me the Sea" - 4:50
 "The Car Maker" - 4:05
 "A Bell and Tumble" - 4:18
 "Under the Texas Sky" - 3:04
 "Youngest Frankenstein" - 2:49
 "Before We're Dead" - 3:57
 "The Octopus and the Ambulance" - 4:08
 "Put Me in Your Play" - 4:17

Personnel 

 Benjamin Adamson – Trumpet
 Andrew Duncan – Trumpet
 Jeanie Lim – Viola
 Ferraby Lionheart – Guitar, Percussion, Piano, Glockenspiel, Vocals, Melodica, Producer, String Arrangements, Design
 Jeff Lipton – Mastering
 Dan Long – Engineer, Mixing
 Raymond Richards – Pedal Steel, Glockenspiel, Engineer, Photography
 Jessica Thompson – Mastering Assistant
 Dan Weinstein – Sousaphone

References 

Ferraby Lionheart albums
2007 albums
Red Rockets Glare albums